In geometry, given a triangle  and a point  on its circumcircle, the three closest points to  on lines , , and  are collinear. The concept was first published, however, by William Wallace in 1799.

Equation

The Simson line is the set of points  satisfying

where an overbar indicates complex conjugation.

Properties

The Simson line of a vertex of the triangle is the altitude of the triangle dropped from that vertex, and the Simson line of the point diametrically opposite to the vertex is the side of the triangle opposite to that vertex.
In particular, if the points are diametrically opposite, their Simson lines are perpendicular and in this case the intersection of the lines lies on the nine-point circle.
Letting  denote the orthocenter of the triangle , the Simson line of  bisects the segment  in a point that lies on the nine-point circle.
The set of all Simson lines, when drawn, form an envelope in the shape of a deltoid known as the Steiner deltoid of the reference triangle.
The construction of the Simson line that coincides with a side of the reference triangle (see first property above) yields a nontrivial point on this side line. This point is the reflection of the foot of the altitude (dropped onto the side line) about the midpoint of the side line being constructed. Furthermore, this point is a tangent point between the side of the reference triangle and its Steiner deltoid.
 A quadrilateral that is not a parallelogram has one and only one pedal point, called the Simson point, with respect to which the feet on the quadrilateral are collinear. The Simson point of a trapezoid is the point of intersection of the two nonparallel sides.
 No convex polygon with at least 5 sides has a Simson line.

Proof of existence
The method of proof is to show that .  is a cyclic quadrilateral, so .  is a cyclic quadrilateral (Thales' theorem), so . Hence . Now  is cyclic, so . Therefore .

Generalizations

Generalization 1

 Let ABC be a triangle, let a line ℓ go through circumcenter O, and let a point P lie on the circumcircle. Let AP, BP, CP meet ℓ at Ap, Bp, Cp respectively. Let A0, B0, C0 be the projections of Ap, Bp, Cp onto BC, CA, AB, respectively. Then A0, B0, C0 are collinear. Moreover, the new line passes through the midpoint of PH, where H is the orthocenter of ΔABC. If ℓ passes through P, the line coincides with the Simson line.

Generalization 2

 Let the vertices of the triangle ABC lie on the conic Γ, and let  Q, P be two points in the plane. Let PA, PB, PC intersect the conic at A1, B1, C1 respectively. QA1 intersects BC at A2, QB1 intersects AC at B2, and QC1 intersects AB at C2. Then the four points A2, B2, C2, and P are collinear if only if Q lies on the conic Γ.

Generalization 3
 R. F. Cyster generalized the theorem to cyclic quadrilaterals in The Simson Lines of a Cyclic Quadrilateral

See also
Pedal triangle
Robert Simson

References

External links

 Simson Line at cut-the-knot.org
 F. M. Jackson and 
 A generalization of Neuberg's theorem and the Simson-Wallace line at Dynamic Geometry Sketches, an interactive dynamic geometry sketch.

Straight lines defined for a triangle